Parisian Backyard is an oil-on-canvas painting by Finnish artist Akseli Gallen-Kallela from 1884. The work is 28 × 23 cm in size and belongs to the Ateneum, part of the Finnish National Gallery in Helsinki, where it was donated in 1945.

History and description
The Parisian Backyard is a work of Gallen-Kallela's first trip to Paris, in the autumn of 1884. He visited it on a study trip. There he painted some academic works as part of his studies, as well as other paintings such as the Parisian Backyard. He made the painting from the window of his living room at the Rue Fontaine 21, and behind it he later wrote, "Painted in December while I was sick and in great dullness."

In the painting, Gallen-Kallela is particularly sensitive to the perception of light. In the foreground stands a dark leafless tree in the backyard, in a late autumn landscape. Behind it stand the dirty-gray brick neighboring buildings and a mere patch of white sky visible at the top left of the painting.

References

1884 paintings
Paintings by Akseli Gallen-Kallela